Dniester HES-1 is a 702 MW (6х117 MW) hydroelectric power station at the Dniester near Novodnistrovsk, Ukraine. It was launched in commercial operation 1983. Both Dniester Hydroelectric Station and Dniester Pumped Storage Power Station are administered by the Ukrainian Hydro-Energy Administration and compose the Dniester Cascade of power stations. Dniester HES-2 is located downstream and has a 27 MW capacity.

See also

 Hydroelectricity in Ukraine
 Dniester Pumped Storage Power Station
 Dubăsari Hydroelectric Power Plant – located downstream
 List of power stations in Ukraine

References

Hydroelectric power stations in Ukraine
Hydroelectric power stations built in the Soviet Union
Dams completed in 1983
Energy infrastructure completed in 1983
Dams in Ukraine
Gravity dams
Moldova–Ukraine border
Dams on the Dniester